Richard Lansing Conolly (April 26, 1892 – March 1, 1962) was a United States Navy admiral, who served during World War I and World War II.

Early life
Conolly was born in Waukegan, Illinois, attended Lake Forest Academy and was appointed to the United States Naval Academy, Annapolis, graduating in 1914. He was assigned to the battleship  and served in Mexican waters. Between May and November 1915 he received training aboard the armored cruiser , and in March 1916 he was assigned to the battleship  as Torpedo Officer.

Naval career

World War I

Transferred in May 1916 to the destroyer , Conolly was aboard her when the United States entered World War I in April 1917. Smith performed escort duty in European waters out of Brest, France.

Conolly was awarded the Navy Cross for his actions in connection with the salvaging of the transport ship , which was hit by two torpedoes launched by the German submarine  in August 1918. Conolly, with a party of eight others remained on board the badly damaged ship for five days, steering by hand and handling the lines from the tugs, while the ship was towed  to port.

Inter-war period
From August 1920 he studied electrical engineering at Annapolis and Columbia University, New York, receiving a Master of Science degree in June 1922. He then served aboard the battleship , transferring to the battleship  in March 1924 to serve as assistant Engineer Officer until September 1925. He then returned to Annapolis, this time as an instructor in the Department of Electrical Engineering and Physics.

In June 1927 Conolly returned to sea as Engineer Officer of the light cruiser . In August 1929 he assumed command of the destroyer . He completed the junior course at the Naval War College, Newport, Rhode Island in May 1931, and remained on the staff for two years.

In May 1933 Conolly reported as aide and Flag Secretary on the staff of Commander Cruisers, Scouting Force, and from April 1935 until June 1936 he served as Navigator aboard the battleship . He then returned to the Naval Academy, serving as an instructor in the Department of Electrical Engineering and Physics, and later in the Department of Seamanship and Navigation.

Conolly assumed command of Destroyer Division 7 in May 1939, transferring to Destroyer Squadron 6 on 30 January 1941. He was at sea, in command of DESRON 6 at the time of the Japanese attack on Pearl Harbor on 7 December 1941.

World War II
Conolly participated in the initial attack on the Gilbert and Marshall Islands on 1 February 1942, as part of the force under the command of Admiral William Halsey, Jr., and in April his destroyers served as escort for the aircraft carrier , from which Lieutenant General Jimmy Doolittle's aircraft took off for the first bombing raid on Tokyo. He also participated in a shore bombardment of Wake Island in command of the destroyers in Rear Admiral Raymond A. Spruance's Task Group.

Promoted to rear admiral in July 1942, Conolly served on the staff of the Chief of Naval Operations (CNO) and Commander-in-Chief (C-in-C) Fleet Admiral Ernest King.

Between March and October 1943 Conolly served with the Amphibious Force Atlantic Fleet, taking part in the invasions of Sicily and Italy. Transferred to the Pacific, he was with amphibious forces in the Pacific and participated in the landings on Kwajalein, Wake and Marcus Islands.

Conolly commanded Group 3, Amphibious Force, Pacific Fleet during 1944 and 1945, and led the landings on Guam in July 1944, and the Lingayen Gulf in January 1945.

Conolly gained the nickname "Close-In Conolly" from his insistence that fire support ships should be extremely close to the beach during amphibious assaults. Conolly believed that strong fortifications could be neutralized only by direct hits, which could only be achieved from the shortest possible range.

Post-war
Conolly was naval representative to the 1946 Paris Peace Conference. He commanded the United States Twelfth Fleet from September 1946 until January 1947, then United States Naval Forces Eastern Atlantic and Mediterranean from 1947 until 1950.

Conolly's last assignment was as President of the Naval War College at Newport, Rhode Island, between 1950 and 1953. Conolly retired with the rank of admiral in November 1953, and was then the president of Long Island University until 1962.

On 1 March 1962 Conolly and his wife, Helen B. Conolly, were passengers aboard American Airlines Flight 1, which crashed into Jamaica Bay soon after take-off from Idlewild Airport, New York City, killing all 95 passengers and crew aboard.

He was buried at Arlington National Cemetery, Arlington, Virginia.

References

 Tucker, Spencer, Who's Who in Twentieth Century Warfare, Routledge (2001)

External links
 Richard Lansing Conolly at ArlingtonCemetery.net, an unofficial website

1892 births
1962 deaths
People from Waukegan, Illinois
Lake Forest Academy alumni
United States Navy admirals
United States Naval Academy alumni
Presidents of the Naval War College
United States Navy personnel of World War I
United States Navy World War II admirals
Recipients of the Navy Cross (United States)
Victims of aviation accidents or incidents in 1962
Victims of aviation accidents or incidents in the United States
Burials at Arlington National Cemetery
Accidental deaths in New York (state)
Recipients of the Navy Distinguished Service Medal
Recipients of the Legion of Merit
Military personnel from Illinois
20th-century American academics